The Liberty Square is an important square at the Aziziyah district, downtown Aleppo, Syria.

Intersected by Yusuf al-Azma street from the south to the north, the square is considered to be the beginning of Qustaki al-Himsi street and the end of Faris al-Khoury street from the east, where the church of Saint Michael the Archangel of the Melkite Greek Catholics is located. The main entrance of the Aleppo Public Park is located at the western side of the square on Majd Al-Deen Al-Jabiri street. It is the starting point of many other narrow streets-branches as well.

The Liberty Square of Aleppo is surrounded with many restaurants, bars and cafés.

Since 1971, the bust of the Syrian poet and writer Qustaki al-Himsi is erected at the centre of the square.

Gallery

See also
Aleppo
Qestaki al-Homsi

References

Squares in Aleppo